The Neosho River is a tributary of the Arkansas River in eastern Kansas and northeastern Oklahoma in the United States. Its tributaries also drain portions of Missouri and Arkansas. Via the Arkansas, it is part of the Mississippi River watershed. Its name is an Osage word meaning "clear water." The lower section is also known as the Grand River.

Course 
The Neosho's headwaters are in Morris County, Kansas, and it flows southeast through Kansas.  In Ottawa County, Oklahoma, the river turns south-southwest for the remainder of its course through Oklahoma.  It meets the Arkansas River near the city of Muskogee, about a mile downstream of the confluence of the Arkansas River and the Verdigris River. The area of convergence of the three rivers Arkansas, Verdigris and Neosho is called "Three Forks."

In Oklahoma the Neosho ends at its confluence with Spring River at the Twin Bridges Area at Grand Lake State Park. From that point on it is called the Grand River. The Grand River flows south to the Grand Lake.

Dams 
The Neosho has been dammed at several points along its course, in most cases by the U.S. Army Corps of Engineers. In Kansas, a dam upstream of Council Grove forms Council Grove Lake, and a dam near New Strawn forms John Redmond Reservoir. There are also 12 dams in between John Redmond and the Kansas border, including lowhead dams at Burlington, Neosho Falls, Iola, Humboldt, two near Chanute and Erie.   In Oklahoma, a dam at Langley forms the Neosho's largest reservoir, the Grand Lake o' the Cherokees. A dam near Locust Grove forms Lake Hudson, (also known as Markham Ferry Reservoir), and a dam upstream of Fort Gibson forms Fort Gibson Lake.

Tributaries 
In Kansas, the Neosho is joined by the Cottonwood River in Lyon County.  In Oklahoma, it is joined by the Spring River in Ottawa County and the Elk River in Delaware County.

Cities and towns along the river 
 Americus, Kansas
 Burlington, Kansas
 Chetopa, Kansas
 Chanute, Kansas
 Chouteau, Oklahoma
 Council Grove, Kansas
 Disney, Oklahoma
 Emporia, Kansas
 Erie, Kansas
 Fort Gibson, Oklahoma
 Grand Lake Towne, Oklahoma
 Hartford, Kansas
 Humboldt, Kansas
 Iola, Kansas
 Langley, Oklahoma
 Le Roy, Kansas
 Miami, Oklahoma
 Neosho Falls, Kansas
 Neosho Rapids, Kansas
 Oswego, Kansas
 Parkerville, Kansas
 Pensacola, Oklahoma
 Pin Oak Acres, Oklahoma
 Salina, Oklahoma
 Strang, Oklahoma
 St. Paul, Kansas
 Shaw, Kansas
 Rollin, Kansas
 Petrolia, Kansas
 Bassett, Kansas
 Strauss, Kansas
 Laneville, Kansas
 Montana, Kansas
 Hoag, Kansas
 Saulkner, Kansas
 Harmon, Kansas

Variant names 
According to the Geographic Names Information System, the Neosho River has also been known as:
 Grand River, particularly past the confluence of the Neosho and Spring rivers in Oklahoma—see Grand River (Oklahoma)
 Le Grande Riviere
 Nee Ozho River
 Neozhoo River
 Ni-u-sho River
 Niocho River
 Nion-chou River
 Noshow River
 Osage River
 Rio Blanco
 Six Bulls River

See also 
 List of Kansas rivers
 List of Oklahoma rivers
 Great Flood of 1951

References

Rivers of Kansas
Rivers of Oklahoma
Tributaries of the Arkansas River
Rivers of Allen County, Kansas
Rivers of Morris County, Kansas
Rivers of Lyon County, Kansas
Rivers of Ottawa County, Oklahoma
Rivers of Labette County, Kansas
Rivers of Mayes County, Oklahoma
Rivers of Neosho County, Kansas
Rivers of Woodson County, Kansas
Rivers of Lincoln County, Kansas
Rivers of Coffey County, Kansas